Salovka is a rural locality (a settlement) in Olkhovatskoye Urban Settlement, Olkhovatsky District, Voronezh Oblast, Russia. The population was 339 as of 2010. There are 2 streets.

Geography 
Salovka is located 4 km north of Olkhovatka (the district's administrative centre) by road. Rakovka is the nearest rural locality.

References 

Rural localities in Olkhovatsky District